The Canby Ferry is a cable ferry in the U.S. state of Oregon that connects Canby, and Wilsonville/Stafford in Clackamas County across the Willamette River. The service has been in operation since 1914, except from 1946 to 1953.  The specific vessel used has been replaced and updated several times, most recently in 1997. It is one of three remaining ferries on the Willamette River.

The ferry has room for six cars (or 75 tons) and a total passenger capacity of 49. A toll is charged for all crossings. As of July 2017, a passenger car costs $5.00, a motorcycle, bicycle, or pedestrian $2.00, and $30.00 is charged if a vehicle takes up the entire ferry.  The vessel currently used, the M.J. Lee II, is a cable-guided vessel powered by electricity provided by overhead lines and is guided across the river by an underwater cable  in diameter, leaving the vessel relatively unaffected by the river's currents.

The ferry is required by the Navigation Rules to display a day shape and, at night, certain lights that communicate to other vessels its (right-of-way) rights on navigable waters.
Because the ferry is guided by an underwater cable, and is fed electricity from an overhead cable, its ability to maneuver is restricted.  Such vessels must display the day shape for restricted maneuverability which is a ball, diamond, and ball displayed vertically in the rigging.  As the Canby Ferry is permanently with restricted maneuverability, the shipbuilders mounted a metal ball-diamond-ball on a mast.  Before sunrise and after sunset, and during periods of restricted visibility, the ferry must display the red over white over red array of a vessel restricted in ability to maneuver.

The ferry is named after Millard Jerome Lee, the first child born in Canby. Lee was born in 1872, two years after the town was platted in 1870.  The vessel currently in use, M.J. Lee II, has been providing the service since 1997.

In 2013, operation of the ferry was suspended from January to July, to allow major maintenance work to be carried out.  The work included retrofitting the vessel with a new propulsion equipment that is quieter and more energy-efficient – using less electricity – than previously.

See also
 Buena Vista Ferry
 Wheatland Ferry
 Molalla River State Park
 Boones Ferry
 List of crossings of the Willamette River

References

External links

 Canby Ferry information from Clackamas County Transportation Maintenance
 1960 photo of Canby Ferry from Salem Public Library

 

Ferries of Oregon
Transportation in Clackamas County, Oregon
Canby, Oregon
Crossings of the Willamette River
1914 establishments in Oregon
Cable ferries in the United States
Trolley ferries